Dimitri "Dima" Gedevanishvili (born January 30, 1993) is a Georgian alpine skier. He qualified to represent Georgia at the 2010 Winter Olympics.

He attends Carrabassett Valley Academy. He is the brother of Elene Gedevanishvili.

References

External links
 Dimitri Gedevanishvili at Vancouver2010
 
 

Male alpine skiers from Georgia (country)
1993 births
Living people